Lucille Clifton ('Wii Nii Puun) (1876–1962) was a leader of the Gitga'ata people, specifically the Laxsgiik (Eagle Clan). She was designated a National Historic Person by the government of Canada on 4 July 2016.

Clifton took on a leadership role in the Hartley Bay community in approximately 1890. Her principal responsibilities in this position included overseeing the territory of the Hartley Bay Laxsgiik clan, providing for members of the clan, and representing the Laxsgiik of Hartley Bay at ceremonies and social functions. In addition to fulfilling these responsibilities, Clifton also took an active role in the preservation and transmission of traditional knowledge. She was especially noted for her extensive knowledge of local plants and their applications for culinary, medical, and manufacturing purposes.

Notes

References

Persons of National Historic Significance (Canada)
1876 births
1962 deaths
19th-century First Nations people
20th-century First Nations people
First Nations women in politics
Indigenous leaders in British Columbia
Tsimshian people
20th-century Canadian women